Lasse Fredriksen (born 8 June 1997) is a speedway rider from Norway, he is a two times Norwegian national champion.

Speedway career 
In 2018 and 2021, Fredriksen won the Norwegian Individual Speedway Championship.

Fredriksen began his British speedway career riding for the Edinburgh Monarchs in the SGB Championship 2022. He had previously agreed to ride for the Monarchs during the 2020 season but the season was cancelled due to the COVID-19 pandemic and the following year in 2021 he encountered work permit issues. In 2023, he signed for re-signed for Edinburgh for the SGB Premiership 2023.

He helped Valsarna win the Allsvenskan during the 2022 Swedish Speedway season.

References 

Living people
1997 births
Norwegian speedway riders
Edinburgh Monarchs riders